Mont-Royal is a provincial electoral district in Quebec, Canada that elects members to the National Assembly of Quebec.  It is located within the island of Montreal, and comprises the city of Mount Royal and part of the Côte-des-Neiges–Notre-Dame-de-Grâce borough of Montreal.

It was created for the 1973 election from parts of D'Arcy-McGee, Dorion and Outremont electoral districts.

In the change from the 2001 to the 2011 electoral map, its territory was unchanged. Following the change in the 2017 electoral map, the riding will be dissolved into D'Arcy-McGee and the new riding of Mont-Royal–Outremont.

Members of the National Assembly

Election results

 

 

 
 

 
 

* Result compared to Action démocratique

|-
 
|Liberal
|Pierre Arcand
|align="right"|12,234
|align="right"|76.32
|align="right"|+5.82

|-

|-

|-
|||||Total valid votes
|align="right"|16,030
|align="right"|98.73
|-
|||||Total rejected ballots
|align="right"|207
|align="right"|1.27
|-
|||||Turnout
|align="right"|16,237
|align="right"|38.79
|-
|||||Electors on the lists
|align="right"|41,855

|-
 
|Liberal
|Pierre Arcand
|align="right"|16,056
|align="right"|70.50
|align="right"|-10.51

|-

|-

|-
|||||Total valid votes
|align="right"|22,775
|align="right"|98.83
|-
|||||Total rejected ballots
|align="right"|270
|align="right"|1.17
|-
|||||Turnout
|align="right"|23,045
|align="right"|54.45
|-
|||||Electors on the lists
|align="right"|42,323

|-
 
|Liberal
|André Tranchemontagne
|align="right"|24,367
|align="right"|80.24
|align="right"|-0.17

|-

|-

|Socialist Democracy
|Robbie Mahood
|align="right"|167	
|align="right"|0.55
|align="right"|+0.05
|-

|}

|-
 
|Liberal
|John Ciaccia
|align="right"|22,827
|align="right"|80.41
|align="right"|+26.84

|-

|CANADA!
|George Butcher
|align="right"|252
|align="right"|0.89
|align="right"|-
|-

|Natural Law
|José Torres
|align="right"|144	
|align="right"|0.51
|align="right"|-
|-

|New Democrat
|Roland Morin
|align="right"|143	
|align="right"|0.50
|align="right"|-0.63
|-

|}

|-
 
|Liberal
|John Ciaccia
|align="right"|10,846
|align="right"|53.57
|align="right"|-25.60

|-

|-

|New Democrat
|John Philip Penner
|align="right"|229	
|align="right"|1.13
|align="right"|-1.86
|-

|}

References

External links
Information
 Elections Quebec

Election results
 Election results (National Assembly)

Maps
 2011 map (PDF)
 2001 map (Flash)
2001–2011 changes (Flash)
1992–2001 changes (Flash)
 Electoral map of Montreal region
 Quebec electoral map, 2011

Provincial electoral districts of Montreal
Mount Royal, Quebec
Mont-Royal
Côte-des-Neiges–Notre-Dame-de-Grâce